Spilosoma wahri is a moth in the family Erebidae. It was described by Walter Rothschild in 1933. It is found on Timor.

References

Natural History Museum Lepidoptera generic names catalog

Moths described in 1933
wahri